Stefano Chiodaroli (born 15 December 1964) is an Italian actor and stand-up comedian.

Career

Early life 
Born in Albizzate, Varese into a family of workers, before focusing on his career as an entertainer Chiodaroli did several jobs including milling machine operator, lathe operator, agent of trade and warehouseman. An expert in Fire breathing and a street acrobat, after acting in some amateur companies, he made his professional debut in 1983 with the comedy ensemble Triopastello.
Graduated in 1990 at the School of Theatre Mimodramma, he participate in theater festivals in  Arkhangelsk in Russia e in Lepujenvelaj in France.

In 1995 he started working on stage as a playwright and later as an actor joining the short-lived trio "Gli Ottomani".

The baker and the success 
In 1998 Chiodaroli created the comic caricature of a short-tempered baker, a character that allowed him to access to some major Italian television variety shows such as  Zelig (Canale 5), Convention a colori (Rai 2) and Colorado Cafe (Italia 1). Other Chiodaroli's characters include the  Celtic demigod "Tempesta Ormonale" (appeared in the Rai 2 prime time show Bulldozer), the surreal "Magician Abatjour", the former fashion model Ornello,  the jazz trumpeter Brian.

In 2005 Chiodaroli had the leading role of Mariano, a good-hearted car thief and thug, in the Italia 1 sitcom Belli dentro ("Beautiful inside").

Selected filmography 
  (2005)
 The Fever (2005)
 Belli dentro (TV, 2005)
 The Bodyguard's Cure (2006)
 Really SSSupercool: Chapter Two (2006)
 2061: An Exceptional Year (2007)
 Don Luca c'è (TV, 2008)
 Cado dalle nubi (2009)
 Angel of Evil (2010)
 In tour (TV, 2011)
 Wannabe Widowed (2013)

Television 
 Saturday Night Live from Milano
 
 
 
 Belli dentro
 Don Luca c'è
 Fiore e Tinelli

References

External links 
 
 

1964 births
Living people
Italian male television actors
Italian male comedians
Italian male film actors
Italian male stage actors
People from the Province of Varese
Italian stand-up comedians
20th-century Italian comedians
21st-century Italian comedians
20th-century Italian male actors
21st-century Italian male actors